Vikrant Rona is the soundtrack album of the 2022 Indian fantasy action-adventure of the same name. B. Ajaneesh Loknath composed the song and background music for the movie and its his first collaboration with actor Sudeep. The music rights of the film is owned by Lahari Music for South languages and T-Series for Hindi language.

Development
B. Ajaneesh Loknath composed the songs and background score, which marks his first collaboration with actor Sudeep. The composition and tuning of the film was started in 2019 and ended in January 2022.

Release
Lahari Music bought the audio rights of Kannada, Telugu, Tamil, and Malayalam versions of the soundtrack album whereas the soundtrack album of its Hindi version were acquired by T-Series.

The single "Ra Ra Rakkamma" served as the first single of the album and was released on 23 May 2022 with Jacqueline Fernandez dancing as a item number with actor Sudeep.
The second single "Rajkumari" which was written by the director Anup Bhandari was released on 2 July 2022. The third single "Hey Fakira" was released on 12 July 2022. The fourth single "Gumma Banda Gumma" (Devil's Fury Theme Song) was released on 21 July 2022. The fifth single titled "Chikki Bombe" was released on 30 July 2022.

Track listing

References

2022 soundtrack albums
Kannada film soundtracks
Hindi film soundtracks